Albert Aeschmann (born 20 August 1900; date of death unknown) was a Swiss weightlifter who competed in the 1924 Summer Olympics, in the 1928 Summer Olympics, and in the 1936 Summer Olympics. In 1924 he finished fifth in the middleweight class. Four years later he finished fourth in the lightweight class at the 1928 Games. At the 1936 Olympics he finished 13th in the middleweight class.

References

External links
Albert Aeschmann's profile at Sports Reference.com

1900 births
Year of death missing
Swiss male weightlifters
Olympic weightlifters of Switzerland
Weightlifters at the 1924 Summer Olympics
Weightlifters at the 1928 Summer Olympics
Weightlifters at the 1936 Summer Olympics
World record setters in weightlifting